The Macaque Cave is a karst cave located on the Macaque Ridge (猕猴岭) outside Dongfang City, Hainan, People's Republic of China.

Description
The cave covers an area of  whilst at the entrance there are densely packed Sindora glabra and Chinese redbud trees. About  inside the cave there is a rock formation that looks like an old woman. There are also stalactites and rocks within the cave in the shape of macaques, lions and tigers. Set into the cave wall there are two chambers that look like the cloisters of a monastery.

References

Caves of Hainan
Karst caves
Karst formations of China
Show caves in China
Tourist attractions in Hainan